Sydney Justine Colson (born August 6, 1989) is an American basketball player for the Las Vegas Aces of the Women's National Basketball Association (WNBA). She played college basketball at Texas A&M University, where she helped the Aggies win the NCAA title during her senior year. She has previously played for the New York Liberty, San Antonio Stars, Minnesota Lynx, and Las Vegas Aces in the WNBA.  In 2022, Colson became a WNBA Champion with the Las Vegas Aces in their first title in franchise history.

Career

WNBA 
Colson was selected in the second round of the 2011 WNBA Draft (16th overall) by the Connecticut Sun. She was then traded to New York.

Career statistics

College 
Source

WNBA

Regular season 

|-
| style='text-align:left;'|2011
| style='text-align:left;'|New York
| 16 || 0 || 5.4 || .350 || .429 || .833 || 0.4 || 0.6 || 0.3 || 0.1 || 1.1 || 1.4
|-
| style='text-align:left;'|2015
| style='text-align:left;'|San Antonio
| 34 || 5 || 15.9 || .411 || .318 || .686 || 1.1 || 2.8 || 0.8 || 0.3 || 1.2 || 3.5
|-
| style='text-align:left;'|2016
| style='text-align:left;'|San Antonio
| 34 || 0 || 16.9 || .431 || .192 || .831 || 1.6 || 2.6 || 1.1 || 0.0 || 1.5 || 5.1
|-
| style='text-align:left;'|2017
| style='text-align:left;'|San Antonio
| 28 || 4 || 11.6 || .330 || .200 || .688 || 0.5 || 2.0 || 0.5 || 0.1 || 1.0 || 2.9
|-
| style='text-align:left;'|2018
| style='text-align:left;'|Minnesota
| 2 || 0 || 8.5 || .429 || .000 || .500 || 1.0 || 2.0 || 0.0 || 0.5 || 2.0 || 3.5
|-
| style='text-align:left;'|2019
| style='text-align:left;'|Las Vegas
| 33 || 0 || 11.5 || .440 || .450 || .818 || 0.7 || 1.8 || 0.9 || 0.1 || 0.8 || 3.3
|-
| style='text-align:left;'|2020
| style='text-align:left;'|Chicago
| 17 || 0 || 6.5 || .429 || .333 || .875 || 0.4 || 0.8 || 0.4 || 0.0 || 0.8 || 1.6
|-
|style="text-align:left;background:#afe6ba;"| 2022†
| align="left" | Las Vegas
| 18 || 0 || 6.8 || .313 || .273 || 1.000 || 0.4 || 1.0 || 0.1 || 0.0 || 0.4 || 1.6
|-
| style='text-align:left;'| Career
| style='text-align:left;'| 8 years, 4 teams
| 182 || 9 || 11.8 || .400 || .299 || .778 || 0.9 || 1.9 || 0.7 || 0.1 || 1.0 || 3.1

Playoffs 

|-
| style='text-align:left;'|2011
| style='text-align:left;'|New York
| 1 || 0 || 2.0 || .000 || .000 || .000 || 0.0 || 0.0 || 0.0 || 0.0 || 0.0 || 0.0
|-
| style='text-align:left;'|2019
| style='text-align:left;'|Las Vegas
| 5 || 0 || 2.8 || .167 || .000 || .500 || 0.2 || 0.2|| 0.0 || 0.2 || 0.2 || 0.6
|-
| style='text-align:left;'|2020
| style='text-align:left;'|Chicago
| 1 || 0 || 0.0 || .000 || .000 || .000 || 0.0 || 0.0 || 0.0 || 0.0 || 0.0 || 0.0
|-
|style="text-align:left;background:#afe6ba;"| 2022†
| align="left" | Las Vegas
| 4 || 0 || 4.8 || .000 || .000 || .000 || 1.0 || 1.0 || 0.0 || 0.0 || 0.3 || 0.0
|-
| style='text-align:left;'| Career
| style='text-align:left;'| 4 years, 3 teams
| 7 || 0 || 2.3 || .167 || .000 || .500 || 0.1 || 0.1 || 0.0 || 0.1 || 0.1 || 0.4

References

External links 
 Career information and statistics from WNBA.com and Basketball-Reference.com

1989 births
Living people
American women's basketball players
Basketball players from Houston
Chicago Sky players
Connecticut Sun draft picks
Las Vegas Aces players
Minnesota Lynx players
New York Liberty players
Point guards
San Antonio Stars players
Texas A&M Aggies women's basketball players